Bale Pandiya is a 1962 Indian Tamil-language comedy film produced and directed by B. R. Panthulu. The film stars Sivaji Ganesan, M. R. Radha and Devika, with K. Balaji, Vasanthi and Sandhya in supporting roles. It revolves around the title character having to evade a lookalike wanting to kill him for insurance money.

The story of Bale Pandiya was written by Maa. Raa. and Joshi, while the screenplay was written by Dada Mirasi. Cinematography was handled by V. Ramamoorthy, and the editing by R. Devarajan. The music was scored by Viswanathan–Ramamoorthy. The features stars Ganesan in three distinct roles, and Radha in two. Production began in early May 1962, ended in the middle of the month, and the film was released on the 26th of the same month.

Plot 

Pandiya, a young jobless man; Marudhu, a small time gangster and assistant to Kabali; Shankar, Pandiya's elder twin brother are look-alikes. Kabali himself is Amirthalingam's look-alike. Ravi also has another personality that he adopts to marry Vasanthi. In the above situation, romance blossoms between Geetha, Amirthalingam's daughter as Kabali turns out to be the enemy of Pandiya. In a comedy of errors completely replete with mistaken identities and look-alikes swapping places with ulterior motives, do Pandiya and Geetha unite?

Cast 
Male cast
 Sivaji Ganesan as Pandiya, Marudhu and Shankar
 M. R. Radha as Kabali and Amirthalingam Pillai
 K. Balaji as Ravi

Female cast
 Devika as Geetha
 Vasanthi as Vasanthi
 Sandhya as Shankar's wife

Production 
Shortly before his trip to the United States in May 1962, Sivaji Ganesan had signed up for a film titled Bale Pandiya, produced and directed by B. R. Panthulu under Padmini Pictures. He visited the studio on the second day of the month, and left on the twelfth after the film was completed. Ganesan believed himself to hold the "world record of completing a film in eleven days time." He played three distinct roles, while his co-star M. R. Radha played two roles. Ganesan spoke in Madras Bashai to play his characters. The story was written by Maa. Raa. and Joshi, while the screenplay was written by Dada Mirasi. Cinematography was handled by V. Ramamoorthy, and the editing by R. Devarajan. According to Panthulu's son Ravishankar, the entire film was completed in 15 days, with shooting going on simultaneously in three places.

Soundtrack 
Music was composed by Viswanathan–Ramamoorthy, with lyrics by Kannadasan. "Neeye Unaku" is set in the Carnatic raga known as Suddha Dhanyasi, and attained popularity. The song "Vaazha Ninaithal" was recreated as the theme song for the Sun TV series Ilakkiya.

Release and reception 
Bale Pandiya was released on 26 May 1962. Sekar and Sundar of Ananda Vikatan praised the film for its comedy and Ganesan's triple role performance. Kanthan of Kalki, however, gave a less positive review, praising Ganesan and Radha's multiple role performances, but criticising the direction and cinematography.

References

External links 
 

1960s Tamil-language films
1962 comedy films
1962 films
Films about brothers
Films directed by B. R. Panthulu
Films scored by Viswanathan–Ramamoorthy
Indian comedy films